Inside Information (May 23, 1991 – October 14, 2017) was an American Hall of Fame and Champion Thoroughbred racehorse.

She was a homebred owned by Ogden Mills Phipps and trained by Hall of Fame trainer "Shug" McGaughey. Inside Information had a record of 14 wins in 17 starts. Among her accomplishments were wins in the Acorn Stakes (Grade 1) at Belmont Park, the Ashland Stakes at Keeneland Race Course, the Molly Pitcher Handicap at Monmouth Park, the Ruffian Handicap (Grade 1), and the Spinster Stakes (Grade 1). In her final start, she won the 1995 Breeders' Cup Distaff (Grade 1) at Belmont Park by a Breeders' Cup record margin of victory of over 13 lengths.

As a broodmare, Inside Information produced the Eclipse Award Champion Three Year Old Filly in 2005, Smuggler. Some of her other foals were wobblers and never made it to the race track.

Inside Information was named American Champion Older Female Horse in 1995. In 2008, she was inducted into the National Museum of Racing and Hall of Fame, the ultimate accomplishment for any American Thoroughbred.

Inside Information died at age 26 on October 14, 2017 at Claiborne Farm from natural causes due to old age.

References

Inside Information's page in the Hall of Fame

1991 racehorse births
2017 racehorse deaths
Racehorses bred in Kentucky
Racehorses trained in the United States
Breeders' Cup Distaff winners
Eclipse Award winners
United States Thoroughbred Racing Hall of Fame inductees
Thoroughbred family 5-f